Lot 50 is a township in Queens County, Prince Edward Island, Canada.  It is part of St. John's Parish. Lot 50 was awarded to Henry Gladwin and Captain Peter Innes in the 1767 land lottery. One quarter of the lot was granted to Loyalists in 1783.

References

50
Geography of Queens County, Prince Edward Island